Burning Empires is an American hardcore punk supergroup formed in 2009 in Milwaukee, Wisconsin, consisting of members of Misery Signals, 7 Angels 7 Plagues and Fall Out Boy. They have released two EPs, in 2009 and 2010, respectively, as well as having opened for The Amity Affliction on their 2010 Australian tour.

Musical style
Burning Empires have been categorized as hardcore punk and compared to work of Darkest Hour, as well as multiple of the member's other band, Misery Signals. In an interview, Ross stated that "musically I wanted to do a band in relation to Misery Signals, a more punky hardcore version of what we were doing influenced by bands like Propaghandi, Comeback Kid and Cursed" and "I find this group is more socially charged than what we’ve done in Misery Signals. A lot of my lyrics up to this point on the Burning Empires material is anti-civilization", in addition to Spin Magazine describing the band as "(ripping) out a heavy, furious sound with thundering double kick drums, screeching electric guitars, and Morgan’s vicious screams".

Members
 Matt Mixon – guitar
 Ryan Morgan – lead  vocals
 Stuart Ross – guitar
 Kyle Johnson – bass
 Andy Hurley – drums

Discography
Burning Empires (2009)
Heirs of the Soil (2010)

References

Hardcore punk groups from Wisconsin
Musical groups established in 2009
Rock music supergroups